Ronny Olsson (born 1 October 1961 in Malmö) is a retired Swedish middle-distance runner. He is best known for winning the silver medal in the 1500 metres at the 1988 European Indoor Championships. In addition, he represented his country at the 1983 World Championships without advancing from the first round.

International competitions

Personal bests
Outdoor
800 metres – 1:46.28 (Oslo 1984)
1500 metres – 3:39.66 (Malmö 1986)
Indoor
800 metres – 1:46.77 (Stuttgart 1987)
1000 metres – 2:21.18 (Sindelfingen 1989)
1500 metres – 3:40.35 (Stuttgart 1987)

References

All-Athletics profile

1961 births
Living people
Swedish male middle-distance runners
World Athletics Championships athletes for Sweden
Sportspeople from Malmö